The Baía de Camamu Environmental Protection Area is an environmental protection area in the state of Bahia, Brazil. It tries to preserve the natural vegetation of mangroves, restinga and Atlantic Forest around the Camamu Bay (Baía de Camamu).

Location

The Baía de Camamu Environmental Protection Area (APA) is divided between the municipalities of Camamu (33.28%), Igrapiúna (2.52%), Itacaré (14.88%) and Maraú (49.32%) in Bahia.
It covers an area of  including land, water, islands and reefs.
Settlements include the seaside village of Barra Grande on the Ponta do Mutá and the city of Camamu within the bay.
The APA adjoins the Itacaré / Serra Grande Environmental Protection Area to the south and the Caminhos Ecológicos da Boa Esperança Environmental Protection Area to the north.

Environment

It is the third largest bay in Brazil, and is known for its scenic beauty and ecological importance.
Vegetation includes restinga, extensive mangroves and remnants of Atlantic Forest in an advanced state of regeneration
Threats include destruction of the mangroves, drainage of wetlands to build condominiums, illegal occupation of permanently preserved areas and replacement of the native vegetation by coconut monocultures.

History

The Baía de Camamu Environmental Protection Area was created by state governor decree 8.175 of 27 February 2002.
The purpose is to preserve the mangroves, ensure the genetic diversity of native flora and fauna, protect fresh, brackish and salt water, regulate land use and occupation, promote development of sustainable socio-economic activities, combat overfishing and protect the remaining rain forest.
The APA became part of the Central Atlantic Forest Ecological Corridor, created later in 2002.

Notes

Sources

Environmental protection areas of Brazil
Protected areas of Bahia
2002 establishments in Brazil